Borrego is 2022 American survival-crime-thriller film written and directed by Jesse Harris. The film stars Lucy Hale, Leynar Gomez, Nicholas Gonzalez, Olivia Trujillo, and Jorge A. Jimenez. The film is about a kidnaped botanist working in the desert of California. The film reached the Global Top 10 the first week of release on Netflix in May 2022.

Plot 
The film follows a young botanist who moves to a small desert town in California to study an invasive plant species, but must fight for her survival when she's kidnapped by an inexperienced drug mule after his ultralight plane crashes in the desert. The nearby small town's Sheriff, his daughter and drug receiver all become intertwined in the odyssey. The script was inspired by writer/director Jesse Harris's dad who is a botanist.

Cast
 Lucy Hale as Elly
 Leynar Gomez as Tomas
 Nicholas Gonzalez as Jose
 Jorge A. Jimenez as Guillermo
 Olivia Trujillo as Alex

Production
Principal photography began on October 14, 2020, and concluded on November 14, 2021, in Almeria, Spain. Additional filming in Borrego Springs, CA took place in the spring of 2021. First look images were released during Cannes film market in July 2021.

Release 
In October 2021, Saban Films acquired the USA and Spanish rights to the film. It was released in Theaters, On-Demand and Digital on January 14, 2022. The film was released by Netflix in the US and Canada on May 14, 2022. It was the #3 Best Rated Film on IMDB for January 2022. The film reached the Global Top 10 the first week of release.

Reception 
The film was the #3 Best Rated Film on IMDB for January 2022 It received mixed reviews from critics. James Verniere of The Boston Herald rated the film a B+ and called it "a well-made and gripping crime thriller". Joel Damos of Movie Mensch rated it a B+ and stated that "Lucy Hale shines in timely thriller". Jeffrey Anderson of Common Sense Media rated the film three stars out of five, stating that it "doesn't always work, especially when cutting away from its two main characters, but this sun-baked, anti-drug desert-survival thriller is solid enough at its center to make it worth a look." Jon Mendelsohn of Comic Book Resources called the film "a dull would-be thriller that takes an idea that'd fit a 10-minute sequence better and drags the conceit out to a feature film length." Sheila O'Malley of RogerEbert.com gave the film two stars, describing it as "an awkward thriller pasted onto a moody strangers-forging-a-connection drama." The film made the Netflix Global Top 10 when it made its US streaming premiere in May of 2022.

References

External links
 
 
American crime thriller films
American survival films
2020s English-language films
2022 thriller films
2022 films
Films scored by the Newton Brothers